Chah Yusefali (also Romanized as Chāh Yūsef‘alī) is a village in Golestan Rural District, in the Central District of Sirjan County, Kerman Province, Iran. At the 2006 census, its population was 54, in 17 families.

References 

Populated places in Sirjan County